D48 motorway, formerly Expressway R48 is a highway in eastern Czech Republic. 

Expressway sections between Bělotín and few kilometres east of Nový Jičín were built in the 1970s and 1980s, but only as a four-lane main road, so they are too narrow to have expressway parameters. Reconstruction of these sections is planned. The total length of this section is 33 km. Besides these, there are also few kilometres of expressway in operation east of Frýdek-Místek, and there is also a bypass of Český Těšín to Poland.

  of highway is in operation. Another  of the motorway is under construction.

Under construction

Images

References

External links 
Info on ceskedalnice.cz 
Info on dalnice-silnice.cz  

R48
Proposed roads in the Czech Republic